Ogliuga Island Army Airfield is an abandoned airfield located on Ogliuga Island, Aleutian Islands, Alaska.

History
Ogliuga Island AAF was established in 1942 as a result of the Japanese invasion of the Aleutian Islands.   Its primary use was as an emergency landing field by USAAF and Naval Air aircraft during the campaign, not having any permanent units assigned.   It was abandoned after World War II and only some foundations of buildings and the remnants of two runways remain.   In addition, it is reported that ammunition abandoned since the war, can be found at the facility.

See also

 Alaska World War II Army Airfields

References

External links

Airfields of the United States Army Air Forces in Alaska
Airports in the Aleutians West Census Area, Alaska
Closed installations of the United States Army
Military installations in Alaska